Patrick Bouchard (born 1974 in Saguenay, Quebec) is a Canadian animator. A graduate of the Université du Québec à Chicoutimi, he made his first animated film Jean Leviériste while attending that institution.

He is a four-time winner of the Prix Jutra/Prix Iris for Best Animated Short Film for his films The Brainwashers (2003), Dehors novembre (2006), Bydlo (2012) and The Subject (2018), and a three-time Genie Award and Canadian Screen Award nominee for Best Animated Short Film, for Dehors novembre, Bydlo and The Subject.

Filmography
1996: Jean Leviériste
2002: The Brainwashers (Les Ramoneurs cérébraux)
2005: Dehors novembre
2007: Talon d'argile
2007: Subservience (Révérence)
2012: Bydlo
2018: The Subject (Le Sujet)

References

External links

1974 births
Artists from Quebec
Canadian animated film directors
Film directors from Quebec
Living people
People from Saguenay, Quebec
Université du Québec à Chicoutimi alumni